Killigan is a surname. Notable people with the surname include:

Aria Killigan, from Daybreak (2019 TV series)
Duff Killigan, from Kim Possible (see List of Kim Possible characters)
Kip Killigan, Small Soldiers

See also
Killian
McKilligan